This is a list of characters for Ohsama Sentai King-Ohger, a Japanese tokusatsu television drama. It is the fourth series in the franchise released in Japan's Reiwa Era and the 47th entry of Toei's long-running Super Sentai series produced by TV Asahi.

Main characters

King-Ohgers
The King-Ohgers are the monarchs of the five kingdoms, except for Gira, who stole his powers from the current monarch of Shugoddam, Racles Hastie. Each one is armed with the  sword, which is the symbol of their authority as monarchs that they also use to transform via , and the  shield, which can change into one of six different forms depending on the user's fighting style.

Gira
Upon realizing that King Racles has put his ambitions before the well-being of his subjects, Gira steals his Ohger Calibur and declares himself the new king of Shugoddam, but was branded as a criminal by his own country by Racles for defying him.

Yanma Gust
He was born in the slums, but raised to the position of president by his own efforts and intellect.

Himeno Ran

Rita Kaniska
Their true face and gender are a mystery.

Kaguragi Dybowski

Shugods
The  are giant, mostly insectoid, mechanical deities who protect the five kingdoms. The main five Shugods are personally owned by the King-Ohgers, whose suits are themed after them, while the auxiliary Shugods combine with the main ones to form King-Ohger and its alternate forms. The  are a series of Shugods that can transform into  to be used by King-Ohger in battle.
: Kuwagata Ohger's personal stag beetle-themed Shugod nicknamed  by Gira.
: Tombo Ohger's personal dragonfly-themed Shugod.
: Kamakiri Ohger's personal mantis-themed Shugod.
: Papillon Ohger's personal butterfly-themed Shugod.
: Hachi Ohger's personal hornet-themed Shugod.
: A pair of ladybug-themed auxiliary Shugods.
: A pair of spider-themed auxiliary Shugods.
: An ant-themed auxiliary Shugod.

King-Ohger
It first appeared in episode 45 of Avataro Sentai Donbrothers.
: A special combination of King-Ohger with Don Robotaro, appearing only in episode 45 of Avataro Sentai Donbrothers.

Recurring characters

Bugnarak
The  is an evil underground empire that tried to conquer the five kingdoms 2000 years ago, but was defeated and returns in the present time for a second invasion.

Desnarak VIII
 is the earthworm-themed leader of Bugnarak who seeks to obtain the three hidden treasures to change the balance of power between humanity and Bugnarak.

Kamejim
 is the stink bug-themed prime minister of Bugnarak who created the Kamejim based on his research on the Shugods.

Sanagims
The  are Bugnarak's pupa-themed foot soldiers armed with  spades. They can also enlarge.

Kaijims
The  are Bugnarak's monsters created by Kamejim who can also enlarge.
: A pill bug-themed monster. It is destroyed by King-Ohger.
: A firefly-themed monster. It is destroyed by King-Ohger.
: A dung beetle-themed monster. It is destroyed by King-Ohger.

Other characters
He was the original owner of the Ohger Calibur in Gira's possession, which was stolen by the latter when he learns the former's real intentions.
: A mysterious aide to Kaguragi Dybowski who never shows their face in public.

Notes

References

Super Sentai characters
, Ohsama Sentai King-Ohger